See Fritz Polack for the WWII era general.
Friedrich Polack  (1835–1915) was a German educationist and author.
He was born in Flarchheim, Province of Saxony,  educated in Erfurt and worked as a teacher in Schierschwenda, Kammerforst, Erfurt  and  Nordhausen. From 1876 until his retirement in 1904, he was district school inspector in Worbis.
After 1904, he was active as author of school books on history, science and literature. He founded the journal Pädagogische Brosamen in 1898, acting as editor until 1906.

Bibliography
1883, Jugendleben
1883, Geschichtsbilder aus der allgemeinen und vaterländischen Geschichte
1896–1890 Brosamen, Erinnerungen aus dem Leben eines Schulmannes (autobiographical, 3 vols.)
1887, Amtsleben in der Stadt
1888, Aus meiner Jugendzeit 
1896, Philipp Melanchthon, Deutschlands Lehrer und Luthers Freund und Mithelfer : Bilder aus seinem Leben und Wirken ; Zur Jubelfeier von Melanchthons 400jähr. Geburtstage (16. Februar 1897) 
1905, Unser Schiller : zur hundertsten Wiederkehr von Schillers Todestage  
Geschichtsleitfaden für Bürger- und Mittelschulen (with Sattler)
Illustriertes Realienbuch
Kleines Realienbuch (with Machold, 2 vols.)

editor
1880–1905, Aus deutschen Lesebüchern  (with Dietlein, Frick, Machold, Richter, 6 vols.)
1881, Historische Gedichte Für Schule und Haus  
1885, Epische und lyrische Dichtungen erläutert für die Oberklassen der höheren Schulen und für das deutsche Haus (with Otto Frick)
1887, Lyrische Dichtungen  
1889, Aus der Jugend für die Jugend (fairy tales)
1912, Dichtungen in Poesie und Prosa für die Unterstufe

References
"Polack, Friedrich" in: Meyers Großes Konversations-Lexikon vol. 16. Leipzig 1908, p. 71.

German educational theorists
1835 births
1915 deaths